Karl Wenk (born 20 December 1934) is a German former sports shooter. He competed in the 50 metre rifle prone events at the 1964 Summer Olympics and the 1968 Summer Olympics.

Olympic Games
1964 Summer Olympics in Tokyo, competing for the United Team of Germany:
 Shooting – Men's 50 metre rifle, prone – 7th place

1968 Summer Olympics in Mexico City, competing for the West Germany:
 Shooting – Mixed 50 metre rifle, prone – 13th place

References

External links
 

1934 births
Living people
German male sport shooters
Olympic shooters of the United Team of Germany
Olympic shooters of West Germany
Shooters at the 1964 Summer Olympics
Shooters at the 1968 Summer Olympics
People from Lörrach
Sportspeople from Freiburg (region)
20th-century German people